Auerbach is a small river of Hesse, Germany. It flows into the Kinzig in Schlüchtern-Niederzell. It starts from the Schwarzen Born at 428 meters above sea level south of Schlüchtern - Hohenzell. It flows north-west and into the Schlüchtern district of Niederzell at 191 meters above sea level from the left into the Kinzig. The river is 5.3 km long and ends 237 meters away from the start of the river. It has a mean bed gradient of about 45%.

See also
List of rivers of Hesse

References 

Rivers of Hesse
Rivers of the Spessart
Rivers of Germany